Arhâ is a nearly extinct Oceanic language of New Caledonia.

References

New Caledonian languages
Languages of New Caledonia
Critically endangered languages